Justice Fay may refer to:

David Fay (1761–1827), associate justice of the Vermont Supreme Court
Jonas Fay (1737–1818), associate justice of the Vermont Supreme Court

Title and name disambiguation pages